R19 may refer to:
 , a destroyer of the Royal Navy
 R19: May form explosive peroxides, a risk phrase
 R-19 regional road (Montenegro)
 Renault 19, a French automobile
 Samsung Sens R19, a laptop
 , a submarine of the United States Navy